William Henry Munger (October 12, 1845 – August 11, 1915) was a United States district judge of the United States District Court for the District of Nebraska.

Education and career

Born in Bergen, New York, Munger read law in 1868. He was in private practice in Fremont, Nebraska from 1869 to 1878, in Omaha, Nebraska from 1878 to 1879, returning to Fremont from 1879 to 1897.

Federal judicial service

On February 1, 1897, Munger was nominated by President Grover Cleveland to a seat on the United States District Court for the District of Nebraska vacated by Judge William Douglas McHugh. Munger was confirmed by the United States Senate on February 18, 1897, and received his commission the same day, serving thereafter until his death on August 11, 1915, in Omaha.

References

Sources
 

1845 births
1915 deaths
Judges of the United States District Court for the District of Nebraska
United States federal judges appointed by Grover Cleveland
19th-century American judges
People from Fremont, Nebraska
People from Bergen, New York
19th-century American politicians
United States federal judges admitted to the practice of law by reading law